If You Believe It, It's So is a lost 1922 American silent drama film directed by Tom Forman and written by Perley Poore Sheehan and Waldemar Young. The film stars Thomas Meighan, Pauline Starke, Joseph J. Dowling, Theodore Roberts, Charles Stanton Ogle, and Laura Anson. The film was released on July 2, 1922, by Paramount Pictures.

Cast 
Thomas Meighan as Chick Harris 
Pauline Starke as Alvah Morley 
Joseph J. Dowling as Ezra Wood 
Theodore Roberts as Sky Blue 
Charles Stanton Ogle as Colonel Williams
Laura Anson as Tessie Wyngate
Charles K. French as Frank Tine 
Tom Kennedy as Bartender 
Ed Brady as Constable

References

External links 

 

1922 films
1920s English-language films
Silent American drama films
1922 drama films
Paramount Pictures films
Films directed by Tom Forman
Lost American films
American black-and-white films
American silent feature films
1922 lost films
Lost drama films
1920s American films